University of Southern Philippines may refer to two distinct educational institutions in the Philippines:

University of Southern Philippines Foundation (USPF), in Cebu City, formerly known as University of Southern Philippines
University of Southeastern Philippines (USeP), in Davao City, formerly known as University of Southern Philippines